The Game Awards 2016 was an award show that honored the best video games of 2016. It was produced and hosted by Geoff Keighley at the Microsoft Theater in Los Angeles on December 1, 2016, and was live streamed across several platforms. At the event, Overwatch won Game of the Year, Blizzard Entertainment won Best Studio, and game designer Hideo Kojima was honored with the Industry Icon Award.

Broadcast and viewership 
The Game Awards broadcast was streamed on December 1, 2016 at 5:30 pm PST across several video sharing sites, including YouTube and Twitch, as well as on the gaming services Xbox Live, PlayStation Network, and Steam. For the first time, the YouTube stream included options for virtual reality and 4K resolution. Keighley and other event organizers worked with Tencent QQ to have the show livestreamed and translated for Chinese viewers using Tencent's QQ and WeChat clients, and to participate in the Fans Choice Awards; the two services combined had potential for more than 1.5 billion additional viewers. Keighley identified that with China's ban on video games having been lifted in 2015, it has become one of the fastest growing markets for video games, and obtained the Tencent deal was "really an experiment" to see how well the awards presentation would be taken there.

Keighley served at the host of the live event from the Microsoft Theater in Los Angeles. The event featured live performances by Run The Jewels the Doom soundtrack by Mick Gordon, and Rae Sremmurd.

The event included new gameplay videos for several upcoming games. Prior to the event, Keighley stated that the show would have less reliance on computer generated (CGI) trailers and more on in-game footage, which was due to the effect of No Man's Skys misleading marketing earlier in the year. Among games shown during the broadcast included Mass Effect: Andromeda, The Walking Dead: A New Frontier, Prey, The Legend of Zelda: Breath of the Wild, Shovel Knight: Specter of Torment,  Halo Wars 2, Death Stranding, Dauntless from Phoenix Labs, a Bulletstorm remaster, Telltale's Guardians of the Galaxy, LawBreakers, Warframe, Assassin's Creed: The VR Experience, and clips from the 2016 Assassin's Creed film.  Breath of the Wild was also featured in the pre-show.

With the addition of streaming to Asian audiences, the broadcast saw a total viewership of about 3.8 million, an increase of 65% from the 2015 show.

The show is infamous for its marketing tie-in with Schick razor blades. Hydrobot, a buff, humanoid robot with a razor blade head, appeared throughout the show and posed with game developer Hideo Kojima. The stunt was criticized for its commercialized nature.

Winners and nominees 
The nominees for The Game Awards 2016 were announced on November 16, 2016. Candidate games must have had a commercial release date on or before November 24, 2016, in order to be eligible. On November 21, The Game Awards dropped fangames AM2R and Pokémon Uranium from their "Best Fan Creation" nominee list. During a stream before the event, Keighley elaborated more on the situation and explained that the fangames were not legally cleared by Nintendo, who owns the rights to the intellectual property of both games, to be included on the show.

Most of the winners were announced during the awards ceremony on December 1, 2016 with the exception of the "Best Fan Creation" category. Winners are shown first in bold, and indicated with a double-dagger .

Jury-voted awards

Fan's choice awards

Honorary awards

Games with multiple nominations and awards

References 
Notes

Footnotes

External links

2016 awards
2016 awards in the United States
2016 in Los Angeles
2016 in video gaming
The Game Awards ceremonies
2016 video game awards